Arnaud Segodo (born 12 November 1984) is a Beninese former professional tennis player.

Segodo, a left-hander from Cotonou, was coached in the sport by his father from an early age, before being sent by his federation to South Africa to train in the country's academies. 

The African junior champion in 2000, Segodo was ranked as high as 30 in the world on the ITF Juniors tour.

Segodo played for the Benin Davis Cup team in 2001 and 2003, amassing seven singles wins. His best singles world ranking of 354 is the highest ever attained by a player from Benin.

ITF Futures finals

Singles: 4 (2–2)

Doubles: 2 (2–0)

References

External links
 
 
 

1984 births
Living people
Beninese male tennis players
People from Cotonou